Alfred Brunswig (born 13 June 1877 in Plau am See; died 22 June 1927 in Münster) was a German philosopher. He taught at Westphalian Wilhelms-University in Münster (Westphalia).

After graduation in Munich 1896 he studied there and in Berlin to promotion in 1904 with Theodor Lipps and initially took its psychologism. After private studies with Edmund Husserl in Göttingen and Carl Stumpf in Berlin followed in 1910 in Munich, the Habilitation. He criticized Husserl evidence concept in the essences. From 1914 to 1918 he served in World War I and received the Iron Cross second class. In the winter semester 1916/17 he was appointed to Munster. He had the "courage to metaphysics" found through his front experience and returned hereinafter apparent faith. He was Protestant, probably with some Jewish roots. His Leibniz interpretation 1925 came the "Germanic thinkers" out.

Literary works
 Das Vergleichen und die Relationserkenntnis, Leipzig/Berlin: B. G. Teubner, 1910
 Das Grundproblem Kants, 1914
 Hegel, 1922
 Leibniz, 1922

References
 https://portal.dnb.de/opac.htm?method=simpleSearch&query=116814101

1877 births
1929 deaths
People from Plau am See
19th-century German philosophers
People from the Grand Duchy of Mecklenburg-Schwerin
Academic staff of the University of Münster
German male writers
20th-century German philosophers